Paolo Tofoli (born August 14, 1966 in Fermo) is a former Italian volleyball player and current coach, standing at 188 cm.

He played 342 times for the Italy national volleyball team. Tofoli was two time world champion in 1990 and 1994. He was also four times gold medal at the European Championship (1989, 1993, 1995 and 1999).  He represented Italy at four Summer Olympics, winning two silver medals and a bronze medal.

Starting from the season 2010/2011, Tofoli is working as the coach of the Italian women volleyball team Scavolini Pesaro.

Clubs

Individual awards
 1990 FIVB World League "Best Setter"
 1994 FIVB Volleyball Men's World Championship Best Setter

State awards
 2000  Knight's Order of Merit of the Italian Republic
 2004  Officer's Order of Merit of the Italian Republic

References

1966 births
Living people
People from Fermo
Italian men's volleyball players
Olympic volleyball players of Italy
Olympic silver medalists for Italy
Olympic bronze medalists for Italy
Volleyball players at the 1992 Summer Olympics
Volleyball players at the 1996 Summer Olympics
Volleyball players at the 2000 Summer Olympics
Volleyball players at the 2004 Summer Olympics
Olympic medalists in volleyball
Medalists at the 2004 Summer Olympics
Medalists at the 2000 Summer Olympics
Medalists at the 1996 Summer Olympics
Competitors at the 1990 Goodwill Games
Goodwill Games medalists in volleyball
Sportspeople from the Province of Fermo